The following is a list automobiles assembled in the United States. Note that this refers to final assembly only, and that in many cases the majority of added value work is performed in other regions through manufacture of component parts from raw materials.

See also

Automotive industry in the United States
List of countries by motor vehicle production
List of automobile-related articles

References

Automotive industry in the United States
Industry in the United States
Manufacturing-related lists
Automobiles

United States